Ilex illustris is a species of plant in the family Aquifoliaceae. It is endemic to Peninsular Malaysia.

References

illustris
Endemic flora of Peninsular Malaysia
Conservation dependent plants
Taxonomy articles created by Polbot